Korea Sings is a South Korean music program. It airs live on KBS 1TV on Sunday at 12:10 beginning November 9, 1980. For South Korean holidays, the show has been hosted overseas. In 2003, the show was hosted in Pyongyang during National Liberation Day of Korea.

History
The show  originally started as a program called KBS National Singing Fight from 1972 to 1977.

Description
According to the official program page, the show is described as "a show of battles of wit and exciting songs between amateur guests who passed the preliminary in their local regions which aims to make people touched, have good memories, and give honest smiles to the audience with things to be proud of the region that are unique to the area."

References

External links
  
 

1980 South Korean television series debuts
1980s South Korean television series
1990s South Korean television series
2000s South Korean television series
2010s South Korean television series
Korean-language television shows
South Korean music television shows
Music competitions in South Korea
Korean Broadcasting System original programming
Television productions suspended due to the COVID-19 pandemic